Bay Obaoca is an unorganized territory forming part of the Matawinie Regional County Municipality which is part of the administrative region of Lanaudière, in Quebec, in Canada.

Toponymy 
His name was formalized on March 13, 1986 in the Bank of place names of Commission de toponymie du Québec (Geographical Names Board of Québec). It takes its name from the Obaoca Bay, located north-west end of Kempt Lake (Matawinie).

Geography 

See also
List of unorganized territories in Quebec

References

Unorganized territories in Lanaudière
Matawinie Regional County Municipality